Hugh II may refer to:

 Hugh II of Lusignan (c. 910/5–967)
 Hugh II, Count of Maine (920–before 992)
 Hugh Magnus, co-king of France (1007-1025)
 Hugh II, Viscount of Châteaudun (died 1026)
 Hugh II, Count of Ponthieu (died 1052)
 Hugh II, Count of Empúries (c. 1035–1116)
 Hugh II Bardoul, Lord of Broyes (died before 1121)
 Hugh II, Count of Saint-Pol (died 1130)
 Hugh II, Duke of Burgundy (1084–1143)
 Hugh II of Jaffa (c. 1106–1134)
 Hugh II (bishop of Grenoble) (died 1155), also archbishop of Vienne
 Hugh II of Rodez (c. 1135–1208)
 Hugh II of Saint Omer (ca. 1150–1204)
 Hugh II, Count of Rethel (died 1227)
 Hugh II, Count of Angoulême (1221–1250), a.k.a. Hugh XI of Lusignan
 Hugh II of Cyprus (1252/3–1267), ruler, also of Jerusalem
 Hugh II, Count of Blois (died 1307)
 Hugh II of Arborea (died 1336)
 Hugh II of Chalon-Arlay (1334–1388)